Monardella purpurea is a species of flowering plant in the mint family known by the common names Siskiyou monardella and serpentine monardella.

It is native to the mountains of northern California and southern Oregon, including the Klamath Mountains. It grows in rocky slopes, chaparral, woodlands, montane forests and serpentine soils.

Description
It is a perennial herb producing an erect, purple stem up to about 40 centimeters in maximum height. The oppositely arranged leaves are leathery, widely lance-shaped, and up to 3 centimeters long.

The inflorescence is a head of several flowers blooming in a cup of leathery purplish bracts. The pinkish purple flowers are just over a centimeter long, narrow and tubular in shape with pointed lobes and protruding stamens. Flowers bloom June to July.

References

External links
 Calflora Database: Monardella purpurea   (Siskiyou monardella)
 Jepson Manual eFlora treatment ofMonardella purpurea 
 USDA Plants Profile for Monardella purpurea
 UC Photos gallery — Monardella purpurea

purpurea
Flora of California
Flora of Oregon
Flora of the Klamath Mountains
Endemic flora of the United States
Natural history of the California chaparral and woodlands
Natural history of the California Coast Ranges
Natural history of the San Francisco Bay Area
Taxa named by John Thomas Howell
Flora without expected TNC conservation status